Fraxern is a municipality in the district of Feldkirch in the Austrian state of Vorarlberg.

Fraxern lies in the mountains next to Feldkirch at an altitude of 817 m. 54.6 % of the municipality is covered by forest and 26.7 % are meadows.

The first written mention of Fraxern ("Fraxnara", meaning ash), dates back to 1127.

Fraxern is famous for its cherries and its cherry schnaps.

Population

References

Cities and towns in Feldkirch District